Grylls Monument in Helston, Cornwall, is designated by Historic England as a Grade II* listed building. It is dedicated to Humphry Millet Grylls, a businessman who had kept a local tin mine, Wheal Vor, open through a period of recession, safeguarding 1,200 jobs. The monument was funded by public subscription, and built in 1834. The monument is built out of granite ashlar in a Gothic style, and provides a gateway into a bowling green.

History
In 1819, two of the owners of Wheal Vor were declared bankrupt, and Humphry Millet Grylls, a local solicitor and banker, was appointed as an assignee. Grylls proceeded to purchase the mine, along with others for £18,000, (approximately £ in  terms.) This action kept the mine open, and safeguarded the jobs of around 1,200 people. He was presented with a silver vase in 1830, but after his death in 1834 a public subscription was started for the building of a monument in his memory.

Architecture
The monument was designed by Richard Wightwick of Plymouth, and was subsequently listed as a grade II* building in 1972.

References

Grade II* listed monuments and memorials
Buildings and structures in Cornwall